The University of Michigan Credit Union (UMCU) is a non-profit financial cooperative headquartered in Ann Arbor, Michigan. It has over $1 billion in assets and over 100,000 members . UMCU is not operated by the University of Michigan but has strong ties with it, based on its origins as a credit union for university employees.

History
UMCU was founded on November 8, 1954 as the University of Michigan Employee’s Credit Union, with membership limited to University of Michigan employees. It was initially located in an office in the University of Michigan's Administration Building. In 1982, the credit union expanded its membership to include university alumni and was renamed the University of Michigan Credit Union.

Branch locations
UMCU has nine branches in or near Ann Arbor, three in Flint, one on the Eastern Michigan University campus and one in Dearborn.

References

External links 
UMCU
Credit Union Service Centers
CO-OP Network

Credit unions based in Michigan
University of Michigan
Banks established in 1954
Companies based in Ann Arbor, Michigan
1954 establishments in Michigan